The City of Bayside is a local government area in Victoria, Australia. It is within the southern suburbs of Melbourne. It has an area of 36 square kilometres and in 2018 had a population of 105,718 people.

History

City of Brighton

In 1858, after receiving two petitions, the Government proclaimed the Municipality of Brighton. Brighton was proclaimed a borough in 1863, a town in 1887, and a city in 1919.

City of Sandringham

The Moorabbin Road District was created in 1862 and became the Shire of Moorabbin in 1871. In 1917, parts of the West and South ridings were severed to create the Borough of Sandringham and three years later parts of the South and Cheltenham ridings were severed to create the Borough of Mentone and Mordialloc. The two boroughs became the Town of Sandringham and the Town of Mentone and Mordialloc in 1919 and 1923 respectively and Sandringham the City of Sandringham in 1923.

City of Moorabbin

Created a road district on 16 May 1862 and later proclaimed a shire in January 1871.  A portion of Moorabbin Shire severed and annexed to Brighton Town in 1912 and a portion severed in 1917.  The Borough of Mentone and Mordialloc was established in 1920 and re-subdivided in 1929 and later proclaimed a city in 1934.

City of Mordialloc

Created as the Borough of Mentone and Mordialloc by severance from Moorabbin Shire in May 1920.  Redefined as a portion of Moorabbin Shire being severed and annexed in 1921.  Declared a town in April 1923 and its name changed to Town of Mordialloc in April 1923 and later gazetted a city on 5 May 1926.

City of Bayside
On 14 December 1994 a new municipality was created to form Bayside City Council which comprises the former City of Brighton, the former City of Sandringham and part of the former City of Mordialloc west of Charman Road and part of the City of Moorabbin between the railway and Charman Road. The original proposal for the LGA gave it the name "City of Warrain", warrain being a Boon wurrung word for "by the sea", but the City of Sandringham proposed that the name "Bayside" be used instead.

Bayside was rated eighth of 590 Australian Local Government Areas in the BankWest Quality of Life Index 2008.

Local government

Current Council elected October 2020

Past Bayside Councillors

Past Bayside Councillors Post Boundary changes

Townships and localities
The 2021 census, the city had a population of 101,306 up from 97,087 in the 2016 census

^ - Territory divided with another LGA

See also
 List of mayors of Bayside
 List of Melbourne suburbs

References

External links
 
 Metlink local public transport map
 Link to Land Victoria interactive maps
 Demographics of City of Bayside

Local government areas of Melbourne
Greater Melbourne (region)